The Ad Hoc Liaison Committee (AHLC) is a body whose primary function is to coordinate the delivery of international aid to Palestinians and the Palestinian Authority. It normally meets twice a year usually in New York or Brussels. The AHLC was established in November 1993.

The entities that provide such aid are categorized into seven groups: the Arab nations, the European Union, the United States, Japan, international institutions (including agencies of the UN system), European countries, and other nations. In July 2018, Australia ceased providing direct aid to the PA, saying the donations could increase the PA's capacity to pay Palestinians convicted of politically motivated violence, and that it will direct its funds through United Nations programs.

Structure
The AHLC has 15 members: United States, European Union, United Nations, IMF, World Bank, Russia, Norway, Japan, Saudi Arabia, Canada, Palestinian Authority, Israel, Jordan, Egypt, and Tunisia. The AHLC receives reports from UNSCO, the Quartet as well as the World Bank, the latter acting as the AHLC Secretariat.

Chairmanship
Meetings of the AHLC are chaired by Norway, a role for which it was nominated by Saudi Arabia when the US and the EU were at odds over which of them should be chair.

Meetings
While in recent years meetings have been held biannually, in 2018, there were three meetings at ministerial level.

Following a virtual meeting in February 2021, a physical and virtual meeting was held in Oslo on 17 November 2021.

References

External links 
 UNSCO reports to AHLC
 Quartet Reports to AHLC

Economy of the State of Palestine
Humanitarian aid
Palestinian politics
Foreign relations of the State of Palestine